The 317th Airlift Squadron (317 AS) is part of the 315th Airlift Wing at Charleston Air Force Base, South Carolina.  It operates C-17 Globemaster III aircraft supporting the United States Air Force global reach mission worldwide.  It continues the histories of three squadrons with airlift missions that bear the number 317.

Mission
The mission of the 317th Airlift Squadron is to recruit, train, and support combat ready aircrews in order to meet global taskings.

History

World War II
The 317th was first activated as a transport squadron during World War II and airlifted cargo and mail for the Eighth Air Force within the United Kingdom from 1943 to 1944.

The squadron's second activation was as a troop carrier unit.  After training in the United States, it moved overseas and airlifted troops and cargo in India and Burma from 11 November 1944 to about August 1945.  Through its first eight months in theater, the squadron flew Chinese troops, horses, and mules over The Hump, air dropped supplies, and evacuated wounded. The squadron arrived in theater at a time when British troops were on the offensive in the Chindwin Valley.  Because only a few forward airfields were available, a large amount of supplies for these troops had to be airdropped to them.  The squadron also airlanded at the forward airfields and evacuated wounded aiding the ground troops in the successful outcome of the campaign.

In December 1944, a decision was made to airlift an entire Chinese division and all of its equipment over The Hump to respond to the Japanese capture of Kweilin, which threatened the lifeline to China.  The 317th, along with other transport squadrons, spent most of its efforts until 6 January 1945 in supporting this operation, for which it received commendations from the commanding generals of Army Air Forces, India Burma Theater and Tenth Air Force.

The squadron then turned its efforts toward Burma, while its glider section trained British glider pilots. In February, planning was made for glider operations from Sinthe to seize airfields in the Meiktila area.  However, British forces seized the airstrip at Thabutkon and after one of the squadron's gliders had landed to inspect the field the squadron began operations to airlift an Indian brigade into the field. For this assault landing the squadron was awarded an arrowhead for its campaign ribbon. In April, the squadron glider section landed eight gliders loaded with engineering equipment into the Lewe airfield to level the field for aircraft operation.  An attack the following day by Nakajima Ki-43 "Oscar" fighters resulted in the destruction of five of the gliders. This operation earned the squadron a second arrowhead.

In May 1945, British and Indian forces had driven forward and were closing in on Rangoon.  It was determined to conduct an airborne assault to the south of Rangoon to capture or destroy Japanese gun positions.  The 317th dropped Gurkha paratroopers at Elephant Point in the first combat airdrop in Asia. The squadron converted from a commando unit in September and provided aerial transportation for US and allied units in China briefly after the war until November 1945.

Viet Nam War Era
The squadron was again activated as a special operations airlift unit at Hurlburt Field with a mission of training C-123 Provider aircrews for combat in the Viet Nam War in 1964.  In 1966, the 317th moved to England AFB and a few months later converted to training crews involved in other forms of special air warfare until 1973.

Present Day
Since reactivation in the Air Force Reserve in the spring of 1992, the squadron has flown worldwide airlift missions.  It flew humanitarian airlift missions to Washington DC and New York City, NY, after the terrorist attack on the US, 11 September 2001.

Lineage
317th Transport Squadron
 Constituted as 317th Transport Squadron (Cargo and Mail) on 25 October 1943
 Activated on 28 October 1943
 Disbanded on 9 April 1944
 Consolidated on 19 September 1985 with 317th Transport Squadron and 317th Special Operations Squadron as 317th Special Operations Squadron

317th Troop Carrier Squadron
 Constituted as 317th Troop Carrier Squadron, Commando on 1 May 1944
 Activated on 1 May 1944
 Redesignated as 317th Troop Carrier Squadron on 29 September 1945
 Inactivated on 28 February 1946
 Reconstituted on 19 September 1985 and consolidated with 317th Troop Carrier Squadron and 317th Special Operations Squadron as 317th Special Operations Squadron

317th Airlift Squadron
 Constituted as 317th Air Commando Squadron, Troop Carrier on 6 April 1964 and activated
 Organized on 1 July 1964
 Redesignated as 317th Air Commando Squadron, Utility on 15 June 1966
 Redesignated as 317th Special Operations Squadron on 8 July 1968
 Inactivated on 30 April 1974
 Consolidated on 19 September 1985 and with 317th Troop Carrier Squadron and 317th Transport Squadron
 Redesignated as 317th Airlift Squadron (Associate) on 20 February 1992
 Activated on 1 April 1992
 Redesignated as 317th Airlift Squadron on 1 October 1994

Assignments
 Eighth Air Force, 28 October 1943 – 9 April 1944
 2d Air Commando Group, 1 May 1944
 Tenth Air Force, 10 September 1945
 US Army Forces, India-Burma Theater, ca. January-28 February 1946.
 1st Air Commando Wing (later 1st Special Operations Wing), 1 July 1964
 4410th Combat Crew Training Wing, 15 July 1969
 1st Special Operations Wing, 15 April 1970 – 30 April 1974
 315th Airlift Wing, 1 April 1992 – present
From:

Stations

 Camp Griffiss, England (1943–1944)
 Camp Mackall, North Carolina, 1 May 1944
 Alachua Army Air Field, Florida, 7 June 1944
 Dunnellon Army Air Field, Florida, 21 June 1944
 Camp Mackall, North Carolina, 15 August 1944
 Baer Field, Indiana, 29 August 1944 – 10 September 1944
 Sylhet, India, 2 November 1944
 Detachment operated from Tulihal, India, 11 November 1944 – 18 November 1944
 Bikram, India, 30 November 1944
 Myitkyina, Burma, 5 December 1944
 Kalaikunda Airfield, India, 6 January 1945
 Detachments operated from Dinjan, India, 8 January 1945 – 13 January 1945, and Bikram, 22 January 1945 – 30 January 1945
 Palel, India, 7 February 1945

 Kalaikunda Airfield, India, 13 April 1945
 A detachment operated from Akyab, Burma, 29 April 1945 – 1 May 1945, and Comilla, India, 3 May 1945 – 20 May 1945
 Ledo, India, 1 June 1945
 Liangshan, China, 10 September 1945
 Hsian (Xi'an), China, 25 September 1945
 Kunming Airport, China, 3 November 1945
 Salua Airstrip, India, 10 November 1945
 Hijli Base Area, India, 18 December 1945
 Titagurh, India, 12 January 1946 – 28 February 1946.
Hurlburt Field, Florida, 1 July 1964
England Air Force Base, Louisiana, 15 January 1966
 Hurlburt Field, Florida, 15 April 1970 – 30 April 1974
Charleston Air Force Base, South Carolina (1992 – present)

From:

Decorations
 
Air Force Outstanding Unit Award

 1 June 1964 – June 1965
 15 April 1970 – 15 April 1971
 1 July 1993 – 30 June 1995
 1 July 1995 – 30 June 1997

 1 July 1998 – 30 June 2000
 1 September 1998 – 31 August 2000
 11 September 2001 – 30 September 2003
 1 August 2005 – 31 July 2007

Campaigns
 
 China-Burma-India Theater
 India-Burma
 China Defensive
 Central Burma with two Arrowheads
 China Offensive

Aircraft operated

CG-4 Waco (1944–1945)
CG-15 Waco (1944–1945)
C-47 Skytrain (1944–1945, 1966–1970)
C-46 Commando (1945)
C-123 Provider (1964–1965, 1972–1973)
U-10 Super Courier (1966–1973)

AC-47 Spooky (1967–1968)
T-28 Trojan (1967–1968)
UH-1 Iroquois (1970–1974)
CH-3 Jolly Green Giant (1973–1974)
C-141 Starlifter (1992–1993)
C-17 Globemaster III (1993 – present)

From:

References

Notes

Citations

Bibliography

External links
 315h Airlift Wing Factsheet, 317th Airlift Squadron

Airlift squadrons of the United States Air Force
Military units and formations in South Carolina